Harrison Hand (born November 12, 1998) is an American football cornerback for the Chicago Bears of the National Football League (NFL). He played college football at Temple.

College career
Hand played football at Baylor for three years before transferring to Temple. In 2019, he had three interceptions. He skipped the bowl game to prepare for the NFL draft.

Professional career

Minnesota Vikings
Hand was selected by the Minnesota Vikings with the 169th pick in the fifth round of the 2020 NFL Draft.
In Week 16 against the New Orleans Saints on Christmas Day, Hand recorded his first career interception off a pass thrown by Drew Brees during the 52–33 loss.

Hand was waived on August 23, 2022.

New York Giants
On August 24, 2022, Hand was claimed off waivers by the New York Giants. He was waived on August 30, 2022 and signed to the practice squad the next day. He was released on September 5.

Chicago Bears
On September 13, 2022, Hand was signed to the Chicago Bears practice squad. He was promoted to the active roster on December 22.

Personal life
Hand is the cousin of former NFL defensive end Turk McBride and safety Antwine Perez.

References

External links
Temple Owls bio

1998 births
Living people
American football cornerbacks
Baylor Bears football players
Cherry Hill High School West alumni
Chicago Bears players
Temple Owls football players
Minnesota Vikings players
New York Giants players
People from Cherry Hill, New Jersey
Players of American football from New Jersey
Sportspeople from Camden County, New Jersey